Courtley is a surname. Notable people with the surname include:

Cade Courtley (born 1969), American television host and former Navy SEAL
David Courtley, Chief Executive Officer of Fujitsu Services
Steve Courtley, Australian visual effects artist

See also
Courtney